Mahanagar ("Metropolis") is a Marathi and Hindi newspaper published from Mumbai, India. The Marathi version Aapla Mahanagar ("Our metropolis") was founded by Nikhil Wagle in January 1990; the Hindi version Hamara Mahanagar was established in 1982. Sanjay Bhaskar Sawant is now editor & publisher of Aapla Mahanagar & mymahanagar.com.

Nikhil Wagle was physically attacked by Shiv Sena supporters multiple times for his critical remarks against the party and its leaders.

In 1994, Wagle was imprisoned for a week after he criticized the Maharashtra legislators for paying fawning tributes to a deceased MLA accused of having criminal connections.

On 19 June 2018, Digital web platform named mymahanagar.com was started, which seems to be a part of modernizing effort by the group to reach masses.

See also
 List of Marathi-language newspapers
 List of newspapers in India

References

Marathi-language newspapers